The 1978 Rothmans Canadian Open was a tennis tournament played on outdoor clay courts at the National Tennis Centre in Toronto in Canada that was part of the 1978 Colgate-Palmolive Grand Prix and of the 1978 WTA Tour. The tournament was held from August 14 through August 20, 1978.

Finals

Men's singles
 Eddie Dibbs defeated  José Luis Clerc 5–7, 6–4, 6–1
 It was Dibbs' 4th title of the year and the 18th of his career.

Women's singles
 Regina Maršíková defeated  Virginia Ruzici 7–5, 6–7(9–11), 6–2
 It was Maršíková's 2nd title of the year and the 3rd of her career.

Men's doubles
 Wojciech Fibak /  Tom Okker defeated  Colin Dowdeswell /  Heinz Günthardt 6–3, 7–6
 It was Fibak's 6th title of the year and the 33rd of his career. It was Okker's 6th title of the year and the 77th of his career.

Women's doubles
 Regina Maršíková /  Pam Teeguarden defeated  Chris O'Neil /  Paula Smith 7–5, 6–7, 6–2
 It was Maršíková's 3rd title of the year and the 4th of her career. It was Teeguarden's only title of the year and 15th of her career.

References

External links
 
 Association of Tennis Professionals (ATP) tournament profile
 Women's Tennis Association (WTA) tournament profile

Rothmans Canadian Open
Rothmans Canadian Open
Rothmans Canadian Open
Rothmans Canadian Open
Canadian Open (tennis)
Rothmans Canadian